Wallace Shaw (February 2, 1870 – June 3, 1960) was an American golfer. He competed in the men's individual event at the 1904 Summer Olympics.

References

1870 births
1960 deaths
Amateur golfers
American male golfers
Olympic golfers of the United States
Golfers at the 1904 Summer Olympics
People from Watervliet, New York
Sportspeople from New York (state)